Belvina Mouyamba (born 25 September 1996) is a Congolese handball player for CARA Brazzaville and the Congolese national team.

She represented Congo at the 2021 World Women's Handball Championship in Spain.

References

1996 births
Living people
Congolese female handball players